
Gmina Jeziorany is an urban-rural gmina (administrative district) in Olsztyn County, Warmian-Masurian Voivodeship, in northern Poland.

Villages
Apart from the town of Jeziorany, Gmina Jeziorany contains the villages and settlements of Derc, Franknowo, Jeziorany-Kolonie, Kalis, Kiersztanowo, Kikity, Kostrzewy, Kramarzewo, Krokowo, Lekity, Miejska Wieś, Modliny, Olszewnik, Pierwągi, Piszewo, Polkajmy, Potryty, Radostowo, Studnica, Studzianka, Tłokowo, Ustnik, Wilkiejmy, Wójtówko, Wólka Szlachecka, Żardeniki and Zerbuń.

Neighbouring gminas
Gmina Jeziorany is bordered by the gminas of Barczewo, Biskupiec, Bisztynek, Dobre Miasto, Dywity, Kiwity, Kolno and Lidzbark Warmiński.

References
Polish official population figures 2006

Jeziorany
Olsztyn County